Komjan or Kamjan may refer to:
 Kamjan, Fars
 Komjan, Isfahan